(born 29 September 1992) is a Japanese speed skater.

Oshigiri competed at the 2014 Winter Olympics for Japan. In the 1500 metres she placed 22nd. She was also part of the Japanese team pursuit squad, which won their semi-final, before losing to the Netherlands in the semi-final and to Russia in the bronze medal final, ending up 4th overall.

Oshigiri has won a pair of silver medals at the World Junior Speed Skating Championships, in two team pursuit events.

Oshigiri made her World Cup debut in November 2012. As of December 2014, Oshigiri's top World Cup finish is 17th in a 1500 m race. Her best overall finish in the World Cup is 38th, in the 1500 m World Cup of 2012–13.

References

External links

1992 births
Japanese female speed skaters
Speed skaters at the 2014 Winter Olympics
Speed skaters at the 2018 Winter Olympics
Speed skaters at the 2022 Winter Olympics
Olympic speed skaters of Japan
Speed skaters at the 2017 Asian Winter Games
Medalists at the 2017 Asian Winter Games
Asian Games medalists in speed skating
Asian Games gold medalists for Japan
Asian Games silver medalists for Japan
Sportspeople from Hokkaido
Living people
World Single Distances Speed Skating Championships medalists
20th-century Japanese women
21st-century Japanese women